Kang Dong-ho (born July 21, 1995), better known by the stage name Baekho, is a South Korean singer, songwriter and television personality. He began his professional career in 2012 as a main vocalist of the South Korean boy group NU'EST. He is currently signed under Pledis Entertainment, debuting as a solo artist with the release of his first extended play Absolute Zero on October 12, 2022.

Career

Pre-debut 
Baekho became a Pledis Entertainment trainee after being scouted by the company in 2010. He became better known after he appeared in After School's music video for the single "Play Ur Love". In 2011, he and bandmate JR appeared on the KBS talk show Hello Counselor and were revealed by After School's Kahi as two of the members of NU'EST.

Prior to debuting, Baekho made appearances in labelmates' music releases as a member of Pledis Boys. He was a backup dancer for After School Blue's "Wonder Boy", and featured in Pledis Entertainment's Christmas release "Love Letter".

2012–present: NU'EST and solo ventures 

On March 15, 2012, Baekho debuted as a main vocalist of NU'EST. His stage name was chosen by labelmate Uee, because of his resemblance to Slam Dunk character Hanamichi Sakuragi (known as "Kang Baek-ho" in the Korean version). In 2013, Baekho appeared in the television drama Jeon Woo-chi.

In early 2014, he was diagnosed with vocal fold nodules. However, he decided to continue performing with NU’EST while receiving treatment. Pledis Entertainment announced in November that he would be taking a temporary hiatus from all group activities. His doctors advised that he completely rest his voice and underwent vocal cord surgery. In February 2016, it was reported that he had completely recovered.

In 2017, Baekho participated as a contestant on Produce 101 Season 2 under his real name for a chance to debut in Wanna One. After performing a cover of BTS's "Boy in Luv" on the show, he gained the nickname of 'sexy bandit' from online commenters. In the position-based challenge, he covered Blackpink's "Playing with Fire", and the view count of his fancam reached one million views within three days. He was also noted by commenters for his stable voice in the music removed (MR) performance. After he was eliminated in the final episode, he and the remaining NU'EST members began promoting as the sub-group NU'EST W from 2017 to 2018.

Baekho's struggles with weight and exercise earned him a reputation of being a "fit idol." After a fan sent a photo of him in a gym to Men's Health Korea, the editorial team invited him to be the cover of the magazine's November 2018 issue. He once again appeared in Men's Health Korea for its January 2020 issue.

In September 2020, he became the hair care advertising model for brand The Wood of J One Cosmetic.

Baekho took on his first acting role in a musical as the male lead Haram in the stage play Midnight Sun, which ran from May-July 2021. In the same year, he was cast as the male lead in stage plays Altar Boyz and Equal.

It was announced on February 28, 2022 that NU'EST's exclusive contract with Pledis Entertainment will expire on March 14, 2022 and that Baekho and Minhyun have renewed their contracts with the agency while members Aron, JR and Ren chose not to.

From July 15 to 17, Baekho held his first fan meeting as a solo artist at Yes24 Live Hall in Gwangjin-gu, Seoul where he performed a new unreleased song.

In September 2022, it was announced that Baekho will debut as a solo artist with the release of his first EP Absolute Zero on October 12.

Personal life
On March 10, 2020, Baekho, together with NU'EST members JR, Minhyun, and Ren, enrolled at Hanyang University Institute for Future Talents as freshman in Practical Music Course.

Sexual harassment allegations
In June 2017, a former acquaintance alleged anonymously online that in 2009, when she and Baekho were both in middle school, she had been molested by him on the bus on their way home from cram school. She pressed charges against Baekho later that month, while Pledis denied the allegations and filed a counter suit in response. Pledis also filed a complaint against the accuser for violating the laws on information communication network and information protection. The police forwarded the case to prosecutors in September 2017. On April 16, 2018, the Seoul Central District Prosecutors' Office cleared Baekho of the sexual assault charges, and have since dismissed the case. Baekho was ultimately found not guilty and was acquitted of all charges. The case was also raised to the Korea Communications Commission over the fairness of how the allegations were reported.

Mnet vote manipulation investigation
On November 18, 2020, the Seoul High Court disclosed as part of the ongoing Mnet vote manipulation investigation that Baekho (under his real name Kang Dong-ho) was a victim of voting manipulation when he participated on Produce 101 Season 2. According to the documents the Court released, the manipulation of Baekho's ranking only happened in the final episode of the season, which determined who would debut in the project group Wanna One. It was revealed that Baekho's true rank would have made him part of the group, but was swapped with another trainee's (who was the actual 13th place) by the show's producers, thus taking him out of the lineup.

Although both of the show's producers Kim Yong-bum and Ahn Joon-young alleged that Baekho requested to be removed from the final lineup of his own volition, Pledis Entertainment denied the allegations. CJ ENM (Mnet's parent company) released a statement regarding the progress of negotiations to financially compensate all the trainees who were affected by voting manipulation across all the Produce 101 programs, including Baekho. However, Pledis stated that they had not been contacted by CJ ENM regarding the compensation as of November 18, 2020.

On November 20, 2020, it was revealed that Baekho had been suffering from anxiety disorder during the filming of Produce 101 Season 2, and that Ahn and the Mnet staff were aware of Baekho's diagnosis. Furthermore, Ahn alleged that after speaking to Baekho in May 2017 in regards to his mental health and his involvement in the show, he interpreted Baekho's responses to mean that Baekho wanted to be eliminated from the competition. However, the Court re-affirmed that Baekho was not personally involved in the decision to have his rank manipulated, and ruled him as a victim of unfair elimination through vote manipulation.

Discography

Extended plays

Singles

Soundtrack appearances

Compilation appearances

Other charted songs

Songwriting credits

Filmography

Television series

Television shows

Web shows

Musical theatre

Awards and nominations

Concert/Tour/Fan meeting

Notes

References

External links

1995 births
Living people
People from Jeju Province
Pledis Entertainment artists
Produce 101 contestants
South Korean male idols
South Korean pop singers
21st-century South Korean male singers
Hybe Corporation artists